ŽNK Split is a Croatian women's association football club based in Split. The club was founded in 2009 and it currently competes in the Croatian First Division.

Split won the 2018–19 Croatian Women's First Football League title on the final day of the season with a 3–3 draw against 22-time champion ŽNK Osijek. Split then made it a league and cup double with a 1–0 win over Osijek in the Cup final.

Honours
Croatian First Division:
Winners (3): 2019, 2020, 2022
Runners-up (5): 2014, 2015, 2016, 2018, 2021
Croatian Cup:
Winners (4): 2018, 2019, 2021, 2022
Runners-up (2): 2014, 2016

Recent seasons

European record

Current squad

References

External links
ŽNK Split at UEFA.com

Women's football clubs in Croatia
Association football clubs established in 2009
Sport in Split, Croatia
2009 establishments in Croatia